Dambar is a Nepalese given name. Notable people with the name include:

Dambar Singh Kuwar (born 1959), Nepalese athlete
Dambar Shah (died 1645), King of Gorkha Kingdom
Dambar Shumsher Rana (1858–1922), Nepalese general
Dambar Bahadur Budaprithi a.k.a. Louis Banks (born 1941)

Nepalese given names